The 1940 Australian Track Cycling Championships were held at Lang Park Velodrome in Brisbane, Australia from March 9 to March 11, 1940. The titles were dominated by 18 year old Jack Welsh (NSW) who equalled a 26-year-old record by winning four out of 5 of the senior men's individual titles.

Healing Shield Winners: NSW

References 

Australian Track Cycling Championships
Australian Track Cycling Championships
Australian Track Cycling Championships
Australian Track Cycling Championships